Foster Moreau (born May 6, 1997) is an American football tight end for the Las Vegas Raiders of the National Football League (NFL). He played college football at LSU.

Early years
Moreau grew up in New Orleans and attended Jesuit High School, where he played high school football and basketball.  As a High School senior, Moreau caught 34 passes for 454 yards and six touchdowns as the Blue Jays won the LHSAA Division I state championship. Rated a three-star prospect by 24/7 Sports and a two-star by Rivals.com, Moreau committed to play football at Louisiana State University over offers from Tulane, Mississippi State, Air Force, Louisiana Tech, Louisiana-Monroe, and Louisiana-Lafayette, among others.

College career

Moreau played four seasons for the LSU Tigers. He played mostly on special teams with the kick return unit and as a blocking tight end in his first two seasons, with no receptions as a freshman and six for 79 yards and one touchdown as a sophomore. Moreau enjoyed his most productive season in his first full year as a starter, catching 24 passes for 278 yards and three touchdowns. 

Moreau entered his senior year on the Mackey Award watchlist, was named team captain and chosen to wear the No. 18 Jersey by the Tigers' coaching staff. In his final season, Moreau caught 22 passes for 272 yards and two touchdowns and continued to play on special teams as a blocker on the field goal unit. He finished his collegiate career with 52 receptions for 629 yards and six touchdowns in 49 career games (32 starts). Following the end of his senior season, Moreau was invited to play in the 2019 Senior Bowl, where he impressed NFL scouts in practice and caught one pass for 11 yards in the game.

Professional career

Moreau was drafted by the Oakland Raiders in the fourth round with the 137th overall pick in the 2019 NFL Draft. Moreau signed a four-year, $3 million contract with the Raiders on May 2, 2019 that included a $488,484 signing bonus.

Moreau made his NFL debut on September 9, 2019, against the Denver Broncos on Monday Night Football, making two receptions for 20 yards. Moreau scored his first career touchdown, an 18-yard reception, on September 29, 2019 in a 31–24 win against the Indianapolis Colts. He was placed on Injured reserve on December 9, 2019 after suffering a knee injury the day before in a game against the Tennessee Titans. Moreau finished his rookie season with 21 catches for 174 yards and five touchdowns in 13 games played (seven starts). Moreau was named to Pro Football Focus's All-Rookie team.

Moreau was fined  by the NFL on October 5, 2020, for attending a maskless charity event hosted by teammate Darren Waller during the COVID-19 pandemic in violation of the NFL's COVID-19 protocols for the 2020 season. Moreau finished the season with 7 catches on 9 targets for 140 yards and two touchdowns.

References

External links
LSU Tigers bio
Las Vegas Raiders bio

1997 births
Living people
Players of American football from New Orleans
Jesuit High School (New Orleans) alumni
American football tight ends
LSU Tigers football players
Las Vegas Raiders players
Oakland Raiders players